Kevin William Vann (born May 10, 1951) is an American prelate of the Roman Catholic Church. He was named bishop of the Diocese of Orange in Southern California by Pope Benedict XVI, succeeding the retiring bishop, Tod Brown, on September 21, 2012.  Vann previously served as bishop of the Diocese of Fort Worth in Texas from 2005 to 2012.

Vann is the ecclesiastical delegate for the Pastoral Provision for Former Anglicans.

Early life and education
The eldest of six children, Kevin Vann was born on May 10, 1951, in Springfield, Illinois, to William and Theresa (née Jones) Vann. His father was a postal worker, and his mother was a nurse and clinical instructor at St. John's Hospital in Springfield. After attending Griffin High School in Springfield, Vann studied at Springfield College. In 1974, he obtained a Bachelor of Science degree in medical technology from Millikin University in Decatur, Illinois.

After graduation, Vann worked as a medical technologist at St. John's Hospital.  In 1976, he entered Immaculate Conception Seminary. From 1977 to 1981, Vann studied at Kenrick-Glennon Seminary in St. Louis, Missouri. Vann speaks Spanish and Vietnamese.

Priesthood
Vann was ordained to the priesthood for the Diocese of Springfield in Illinois by Bishop Joseph McNicholas on May 30, 1981. He then furthered his studies in canon law at the Pontifical University of St. Thomas Aquinas in Rome, residing at the Pontifical North American College. In May 1985, Vann earned his Doctor of Canon Law degree.

Upon his return to the United States in 1985, Vann served as parochial vicar at Blessed Sacrament Parish in Springfield until 1990. He served as judge, defender of the bond, and procurator on the diocesan tribunal from 1985 to 1994, also serving on the metropolitan court of appeals for the Province of Chicago. Between 1989 and 1990, Vann was also parochial administrator of St. Mary Parish in Pittsfield, Illinois, Holy Redeemer Parish in Barry, Illinois, and Holy Family Parish in Griggsville, Illinois.

Vann was pastor of St. Benedict Parish in Auburn, Illinois (1990–1992) and later of Our Lady of Lourdes Parish in Decatur, Illinois (1992–2001). While serving at Our Lady of Lourdes, he was also:

 Judicial vicar for the Inter-diocesan Tribunal of Second Instance for the Province of Chicago (1994–2005)
 Parochial administrator of St. Isidore Parish in Bethany, Illinois, Sacred Heart Parish in Dalton City (1995–1997), and Our Lady of the Holy Spirit Parish in Mount Zion (1995)
 Dean of the Decatur deanery from 1996 to 2001 
 Bishop's contact for the Hispanic ministry in 1999

Vann also taught canon law at Kenrick-Glennon Seminary.

Vann became pastor of Blessed Sacrament Parish in 2001. In addition to his pastoral duties, he was also named vicar for clergy in the diocesan chancery. Vann was raised by the Vatican to the rank of honorary chaplain on February 19, 2002. During his tenure at Blessed Sacrament, he oversaw a $2.2 million capital campaign for refurbishing the church, as part of the celebration of the 75th anniversary of its completion in 1930.

In April 2004, Vann said that he would be "reticent" in giving communion to US Senator Dick Durbin (D-IL), a former parishioner at Blessed Sacrament whose "pro-choice position puts him really outside of communion or unity with the Church's teachings on life".

Coadjutor Bishop and Bishop of Fort Worth 
On May 17, 2005, Vann was appointed coadjutor bishop of the Diocese of Fort Worth by Pope Benedict XVI. This was to have been his first assignment as a bishop, but the bishop of the diocese, Joseph Delaney, died on July 12, 2005. Vann received his episcopal consecration, as previously planned, the next day, July 13 (immediately becoming the third bishop of Fort Worth).  Archbishop José Gómez, Archbishop Raymond Burke  and Bishop George Lucas served as co-consecrators, at the Daniel-Meyer Coliseum in Fort Worth Vann selected as his episcopal motto In Fide Et Dileccione In Christo Iesu, "In the faith and love in Christ Jesus".

During the 2008 US presidential election, Vann and Bishop Kevin Farrell issued a joint statement in which they declared that "We cannot make more clear the seriousness of the overriding issue of abortion—while not the only issue—it is the defining moral issue, not only today, but of the last 35 years ... As Catholics we are morally obligated to pray, to act, and to vote to abolish the evil of abortion in America."Within the United States Conference of Catholic Bishops, Vann is a member of the committees on marriage, family life, laity and youth, and the subcommittee on marriage and family life.

Bishop of Orange
On September 21, 2012, Pope Benedict XVI announced the appointed of Vann as bishop of the Diocese of Orange to succeed retiring Bishop Tod  Brown, Vann was  installed on December 10, 2012.

On November 1, 2020, Vann sued the former administrator of the Orange Catholic Foundation.  Vann claimed that the administrator had defamed him by suggesting he wanted to obtain funds from the Foundation for COVID-19 pandemic relief, but actually use them for sex abuse claims against the diocese.

See also

 Catholic Church hierarchy
 Catholic Church in the United States
 Historical list of the Catholic bishops of the United States
 List of Catholic bishops of the United States
 Lists of patriarchs, archbishops, and bishops

References

External links
Roman Catholic Diocese of Orange official website

Episcopal succession

1951 births
Living people
Benedictine University at Springfield alumni
Millikin University alumni
Pontifical University of Saint Thomas Aquinas alumni
Kenrick–Glennon Seminary alumni
People from Springfield, Illinois
Roman Catholic Diocese of Springfield in Illinois
Religious leaders from Illinois
Catholics from Illinois
21st-century Roman Catholic bishops in the United States